Porthecla forasteira is a butterfly in the family Lycaenidae. It is found in Peru, Bolivia and French Guiana. The habitat consists of lowland areas.

The length of the forewings is 15.9 mm for males.

Etymology
The name forasteira is derived from the Portuguese language and means stranger or foreigner.

References

Butterflies described in 2011
Eumaeini